The Hahnen is a mountain of the Urner Alps, overlooking Engelberg in the Swiss canton of Obwalden. It has an elevation of 2,606 metres above sea level.

References

External links
 Hahnen on Hikr

Mountains of the Alps
Mountains of Switzerland
Mountains of Obwalden